The 1933–34 season was Manchester United's 38th season in the Football League.

5 May 1934 was of the most important dates in the history of Manchester United. Going into the last game of the season the team were in 21st place in the Second Division, one point away from safety. However, their future was in their own hands, as in the last game of the season they played Millwall, the team just above them and keeping them in the relegation zone.

That day Manchester United played as if their lives depended on it. They took the lead through Tom Manley and then put the game beyond doubt when Jack Cape added a second. This result meant Millwall were relegated to the Third Division instead of Manchester United.

Second Division

FA Cup

Squad statistics

References

Manchester United F.C. seasons
Manchester United